Albert Campion is a fictional character in a series of detective novels and short stories by Margery Allingham. He first appeared as a supporting character in The Crime at Black Dudley (1929), an adventure story involving a ring of criminals, and would go on to feature in another 18 novels and over 20 short stories.

Supposedly created as a parody of Dorothy L. Sayers' detective Lord Peter Wimsey, Campion established his own identity, and matured and developed as the series progressed. After Allingham's death her husband Philip Youngman Carter completed her last Campion book and wrote two more before his own death.

Fictional biography
Albert Campion is a pseudonym used by a man who was born in 1900 into a prominent British aristocratic family. Early novels hint that he was part of the Royal Family but this suggestion is dropped in later works.  He was educated at Rugby School and the (fictitious) St. Ignatius' College, Cambridge (according to a mini-biography included in Sweet Danger; this is also hinted at in Police at the Funeral). Ingenious, resourceful and well-educated, in his 20s he assumed the name Campion and began a life as an adventurer and detective.

Characteristics
Campion is thin, blond, wears horn-rimmed glasses, and is often described as affable, inoffensive and bland, with a deceptively blank and unintelligent expression. He is, nonetheless, a man of authority and action, and considers himself to be a helpful and comforting 'Uncle Albert' to friends and those in need. In some stories, he lives in a flat above a police station at Number 17A, Bottle Street in Piccadilly, London. In the early stories he has a pet jackdaw called Autolycus.

Names
The name 'Campion' may have its origin in the Old French word for 'champion'. Another source says the name was suggested by Allingham's husband, Philip Youngman Carter, and may allude to the Jesuit martyr St. Edmund Campion. Carter and St. Edmund Campion were both graduates of Christ's Hospital school. Campion's fictional college, St. Ignatius, supports the Edmund Campion connection, since St. Ignatius of Loyola was the founder of the Jesuits. There are also occasional references in the books to the field-flower campion (e.g., Look to the Lady ch. 21), evoking the similar relationship between the fictional hero the Scarlet Pimpernel and the pimpernel flower.

'Albert Campion' is revealed early on to be a pseudonym. In Mystery Mile and Police at the Funeral, his true first name is said to be Rudolph, while his surname begins with a K. In The Fashion in Shrouds he also mentions his first name being Rudolph but confides he changed it, asking people to call him Albert as he did not like the name Rudolph. In Look to the Lady the butler reveals to Lugg that he has deduced who Campion is by a particular feature of his pyjamas which he has also seen on Campion's elder brother's pyjamas.

Campion has used many other names in the course of his career. 'Mornington Dove' (although in the 1988 Avon edition (page 72) of 'The Black Dudley Murder', and in the 1950 UK Penguin edition of "the Crime at Black Dudley", he is called 'Mornington Dodd') and 'the Honourable Tootles Ash' are mentioned in The Crime at Black Dudley; 'Christopher Twelvetrees' and 'Orlando' are mentioned in Look to the Lady.

Family and background
Allingham makes various references to Campion's aristocratic background, and hints at a connection to royalty in several asides.  A study of the books suggests his father was a viscount and was already dead at the start of the series. Campion's mother is mentioned several times and writes a letter in The Fashion in Shrouds, and Campion borrows a car from his older brother (apparently the current holder of the title) in Mystery Mile, but neither of them appears in person. In Sweet Danger, it was mentioned that his brother was 'still unmarried' and therefore Campion is likely to 'come into the title some day.' In Coroner's Pidgin a character mentions Campion's uncle, a bishop, and says, 'Let me see, you're the only nephew now, aren't you?' This indicates that, by the middle of the Second World War, Campion's older brother Herbert has died and Campion has inherited the title.

In More Work For the Undertaker, set just after the war, Lugg addresses Campion sarcastically as 'young Viscount Clever'.  Campion's sister Valentine Ferris plays a central part in The Fashion in Shrouds; in that book, it is revealed that they are both estranged from most of their family.  In Police at the Funeral, the venerable Caroline Faraday is aware of his true identity, and knows his grandmother Emily (whom she refers to as 'The Dowager') – she calls him by his real name, 'Rudolph', and states at one point that the rest of his family blame Emily for encouraging Campion in his adventurous ways.

Associates
From Mystery Mile onwards, Campion is normally aided by his manservant, Magersfontein Lugg, an uncouth, rough-and-tumble fellow who used to be a burglar. Campion is good friends with Inspector (later Superintendent) Stanislaus Oates of Scotland Yard, who is as by-the-book as Campion is unorthodox, and in later books with Oates's protégé Inspector Charles Luke.

In wartime, Campion is involved in intelligence work, and after the war he continues to have a connection to the secret services.

Campion also has many friends and allies, seemingly scattered all across London and the English countryside, often including professional criminals. In the short story "The Meaning of the Act" Campion explains to Oates that the secret of his success is to 'take a drink with anyone, and pick your pals where you find 'em'.

In Mystery Mile Campion is subtly shown to be in love with Biddy Paget, around whose home most of the story revolves; Campion is distraught when, at the end of the adventure, she marries an American, and his sadness at losing her is mentioned again in subsequent stories.

After a doomed passion for a married woman in Dancers in Mourning, Campion eventually marries Amanda Fitton, who first appears in Sweet Danger as a 17-year-old and later becomes an aircraft engineer; they have a son, named Rupert.  Her brother Hal recovers the family title of Earl of Pontisbright as a result of the adventures described in Sweet Danger, and Amanda then becomes Lady Amanda, as the sister of an Earl.

Mr Campion's Farewell

Crime writer Mike Ripley completed an unfinished Campion manuscript, started by Philip Youngman Carter before his death. The fragment, which contained revisions and minor corrections but no plot outline, character synopsis or plan, was bequeathed to Margery Allingham's sister Joyce; upon her death in 2001, the manuscript was left to officials of the Margery Allingham Society.  Beginning in 2012, Ripley, with the approval and agreement of the Margery Allingham Society, completed Youngman Carter's manuscript, which has become Mr Campion's Farewell. The novel was published in March 2014 by Severn House Publishers. Succeeding volumes were entirely Ripley's work.

Bibliography

The Campion stories are generally adventures rather than true mysteries, as they rarely feature puzzles that the reader has a chance of solving; it is the characters and situations which carry the story. Most of the novels are short by modern standards – about 200 pages long.

Novels
The Crime at Black Dudley (1929) (U.S. title: The Black Dudley Murder)
Mystery Mile (1930)
Look to the Lady (1931) (U.S. title: The Gyrth Chalice Mystery)
Police at the Funeral (1931)
Sweet Danger (1933) (U.S. title: Kingdom of Death or The Fear Sign)
Death of a Ghost (1934)
Flowers for the Judge (1936) (U.S. title: Legacy in Blood)
The Case of the Late Pig (1937)
Dancers in Mourning (1937) (U.S. title: Who Killed Chloe?)
The Fashion in Shrouds (1938)
Traitor's Purse (1941) (U.S. title: The Sabotage Murder Mystery)
Coroner's Pidgin (1945) (U.S. title: Pearls Before Swine)
More Work for the Undertaker (1948)
The Tiger in the Smoke (1952)
The Beckoning Lady (1955) (U.S. title: The Estate of the Beckoning Lady)
Hide My Eyes (1958) (U.S. title: Tether's End or Ten Were Missing)
The China Governess (1962)
The Mind Readers (1965)
Cargo of Eagles (1968) (completed posthumously by Philip Youngman Carter)
Mr. Campion's Farthing (1969) (by Philip Youngman Carter)
Mr. Campion's Falcon (1970) (U.S. title: Mr. Campion's Quarry) (by Philip Youngman Carter)
Mr Campion's Farewell (2014) – completed by Mike Ripley
Mr Campion's Fox (2015) by Mike Ripley
Mr Campion's Fault (2016), Ripley
Mr Campion's Abdication (2017), Ripley
Mr Campion's War (2018), Ripley
Mr Campion's Visit (2019), Ripley
Mr Campion's Seance (2020), Ripley
Mr Campion's Coven (2021), Ripley
Mr Campion's Mosaic (2022), Ripley

Short story collections
Mr. Campion: Criminologist (1937) comprising:
 The Case of the Late Pig
 The Case of the White Elephant
 The Case of the Man with the Sack
 The Border-Line Case
 The Case of the Widow
 The Case of the Pro and the Con
 The Case of the Old Man in the Window
Mr. Campion and Others (1939, 1950)
 The Widow
 The Name on the Wrapper
 The Hat Trick
 The Question Mark
 The Old Man in the Window
 The White Elephant
 The Frenchman's Gloves
 The Longer View
 Safe as Houses
 The Definite Article
 The Meaning of the Act
 A Matter of Form
 The Danger Point
The Casebook of Mr. Campion (1947) comprising:
 The Case of the Question Mark
 The Crimson Letters
 The Definite Article
 The Magic Hat
 A Matter of Form
 The Meaning of the Act
 Safe as Houses
The Allingham Case-Book (1969) comprising:
 Tall Story
 Three is a Lucky Number
 The Villa Maria Celeste
 The Psychologist
 Little Miss Know-All
 One Morning They'll Hang Him
 The Lieabout
 Face Value
 Evidence in Camera
 Joke Over
 The Lying-In-State
 The Pro and the Con
 Is There a Doctor in the House?
 The Borderline Case
 They Never Get Caught
 The Mind's Eye Mystery
 Mum Knows Best
 The Snapdragon and the C.I.D.
The Allingham Minibus (U.S. title: Mr. Campion's Lucky Day and Other Stories) (1973)
 He Was Asking After You
 Publicity
 The Perfect Butler
 The Barbarian
 Mr Campion's Lucky Day
  'Tis Not Hereafter
 The Correspondents
 He Preferred Them Sad
 The Unseen Door
 Bird Thou Never Wert
 The Same To Us
 She Heard It On The Radio
 The Man With The Sack
 The Secret
 A Quarter of a Million
 The Pioneers
 The Sexton's Wife
 The Wink
The Return of Mr. Campion (1989) comprising:
 The Case is Altered
 My Friend Mr Campion
 The Dog Day
 The Wind Glass
 The Beauty King
 The Black Tent
 Sweet and Low
 Once in a Lifetime
 The Kernel of Truth
 Happy Christmas
 The Wisdom of Esdras
 The Curious Affair in Nut Row
 What to do with an Aging Detective

Omnibus editions
Crime and Mr Campion (1959) – Death of a Ghost, Flowers for the Judge and Dancers in Mourning.
Three Cases for Mr Campion (1961) – Look to the Lady, The Fashion in Shrouds and Traitor's Purse.
The Mysterious Mr Campion (1963) – The Case of the Late Pig, Dancers in Mourning and The Tiger in the Smoke; also a short story On Christmas Day in the Morning and a preface by the author.
Mr Campion's Lady (1965) – Sweet Danger, The Fashion in Shrouds and Traitor's Purse; also a short story A Word in Season and a preface by the author.
Mr Campion's Clowns (1967) – Mystery Mile, Coroner's Pidgin and More Work for the Undertaker; with a preface by Philip Youngman Carter.

Adaptations

Campion (1959–1960)

Two stories were adapted by the BBC in 1959 and 1960, with Bernard Horsfall as Campion and Wally Patch as Lugg. Each story was shown in six 30-minute episodes. The 1959 adaptation of Dancers in Mourning also featured John Ruddock as Oates, Denis Quilley as Jimmy Sutane, Michael Gough as Squire Mercer and Noel Howlett as 'Uncle' William Faraday. The 1960 adaptation, Death of a Ghost, featured Arthur Brough as Oates.

Detective (1968)
In 1968 The Case of the Late Pig was adapted for television starring Brian Smith as Campion, and George Sewell as Lugg. It was part of the BBC Detective (1964–1969) series which was an anthology series featuring adaptations of detective stories.

Campion (1989–1990)

In 1989 and 1990, the first eight of the novels (excluding The Crime at Black Dudley) were adapted over two seasons, with each story shown in two hour-long episodes. Peter Davison played Campion, Brian Glover was Lugg and Andrew Burt was Oates.

Radio
Various stories were adapted for BBC Radio over the years. Campion was played by James Snell, Richard Hurndall, William Fox, and Basil Moss.
Among them were the following.
"Traitor's Purse" (read by Roger Allam in 10 episodes),
"Look to the Lady" (1961) starred Richard Hurndall.
"Mr Campion's Falcon" (1972) is not by Marjery Allingham: William Fox took the lead role.

Footnotes

External links
 Books featuring Albert Campion at Faded Page
An article about Campion from the Strand Magazine
An Allingham bibliography, with dates and publishers, from the UK Margery Allingham Society
A series of Allingham plot summaries, including many Campion books, from the UK Margery Allingham Society
Another Allingham bibliography, with more alternative titles and links to summaries

Fictional amateur detectives
Fictional gentleman detectives
Crime novel series
Characters in British novels of the 20th century
Literary characters introduced in 1929
Fictional people from the 19th-century